Until 1 January 2007 Ringe municipality was a municipality (Danish, kommune) in the former Funen County on the island of Funen in central Denmark.  The municipality covered an area of 154 km2, and had a total population of 17,177 (2005). Its last mayor was Bo Andersen, a member of  Venstre (Liberal Party). The main town and the site of its municipal council was the town of Ringe.

 Espe Parish (Sallinge Herred)
 Gestelev Parish (Sallinge Herred)
 Heden Parish (Sallinge Herred)
 Hellerup Parish (Vindinge Herred)
 Herringe Parish (Sallinge Herred)
 Hillerslev Parish (Sallinge Herred)
 Krarup Parish (Sallinge Herred)
 Ringe Parish (Gudme Herred)
 Søllinge Parish (Vindinge Herred)
 Sønder Højrup Parish (Vindinge Herred)
 Vantinge Parish (Sallinge Herred)

Ringe municipality ceased to exist as the result of Kommunalreformen ("The Municipality Reform" of 2007).  It was merged with existing Broby, Faaborg, Ryslinge, and Årslev municipalities to form the new Faaborg-Midtfyn municipality.   This created a municipality with an area of 638 km2 and a total population of 51,144 (2005).  The new municipality belongs to Region of Southern Denmark.

External links 
 Faaborg-Midtfyn municipality's official website (Danish only)

References 
 Municipal statistics: NetBorger Kommunefakta, delivered from KMD aka Kommunedata (Municipal Data)
 Municipal mergers and neighbors: Eniro new municipalities map

Former municipalities of Denmark